Institutional Group Home 33 ( – Khāneh Hāy Sāzmānī Gerveh 33) is a village in Juqin Rural District, in the Central District of Shahriar County, Tehran Province, Iran. At the 2006 census, its population was 1,673, in 484 families.

References 

Populated places in Shahriar County